TCDD DH33100 were diesel-hydraulic locomotive built for shunting operations on the Turkish State Railways. 38 units from Maschinenbau Kiel (MaK) were built starting in 1953 and another 25 were built by TCDD in Turkey. In 1980–81 the shunters were rebuilt with Cummins Diesel KT1150L engines.

References

External links
 Trains of Turkey page on DH33100

MaK locomotives
C locomotives
Turkish State Railways diesel locomotives
Standard gauge locomotives of Turkey
Railway locomotives introduced in 1953